Qi Tai (died 1402) was a Ming dynasty official was advisor to the Jianwen Emperor. He was executed by the Yongle Emperor at the conclusion of the Jingnan Campaign.

References
 《欽定勝朝殉節諸臣錄》（卷12）:「齊泰謀參密議，志削强藩，佐主雖疎，致身無愧，諡忠敬。」

See also
Huang Zicheng
Fang Xiaoru

14th-century births
1402 deaths
People of the Jingnan Campaign

Year of birth unknown